Just for the Record may refer to:

 "Just for the Record" (Randall and Hopkirk (Deceased)), a 1969 episode of the British television series 
 Just for the Record (Barbara Mandrell album), 1979
 Just for the Record (Ray Stevens album), 1976
 Just for the Record..., a 1991 box set by Barbra Streisand
 Just for the Record, a 2002 autobiography by Geri Halliwell